The 1981–82 New York Rangers season was the franchise's 56th season. During the regular season, the Rangers finished second in the Patrick Division with 92 points and qualified for the NHL playoffs. In the first round of the playoffs, New York defeated the Philadelphia Flyers, three games to one, to advance to the Patrick Division Finals. There, the Rangers lost to the New York Islanders in six games.

Final standings

Schedule and results

|- align="center" bgcolor="#FFBBBB"
| 1 || 6 || Detroit Red Wings || 5–2 || 0–1–0
|- align="center" bgcolor="#FFBBBB"
| 2 || 9 || @ Winnipeg Jets || 8–3 || 0–2–0
|- align="center" bgcolor="#FFBBBB"
| 3 || 10 || @ Minnesota North Stars || 7–0 || 0–3–0
|- align="center" bgcolor="#CCFFCC"
| 4 || 14 || Vancouver Canucks || 2–1 || 1–3–0
|- align="center" bgcolor="#FFBBBB"
| 5 || 17 || @ New York Islanders || 5–4 || 1–4–0
|- align="center" bgcolor="#CCFFCC"
| 6 || 18 || St. Louis Blues || 5–3 || 2–4–0
|- align="center" bgcolor="#FFBBBB"
| 7 || 21 || Los Angeles Kings || 5–2 || 2–5–0
|- align="center" bgcolor="#CCFFCC"
| 8 || 24 || @ Toronto Maple Leafs || 5–3 || 3–5–0
|- align="center" bgcolor="#FFBBBB"
| 9 || 25 || Montreal Canadiens || 4–2 || 3–6–0
|- align="center" bgcolor="#FFBBBB"
| 10 || 28 || Edmonton Oilers || 5–3 || 3–7–0
|- align="center" bgcolor="#FFBBBB"
| 11 || 31 || @ Boston Bruins || 7–3 || 3–8–0
|-

|- align="center" bgcolor="#CCFFCC"
| 12 || 1 || Calgary Flames || 4–2 || 4–8–0
|- align="center" bgcolor="#FFBBBB"
| 13 || 4 || @ Pittsburgh Penguins || 6–3 || 4–9–0
|- align="center" bgcolor="#CCFFCC"
| 14 || 5 || @ Philadelphia Flyers || 6–2 || 5–9–0
|- align="center" bgcolor="#CCFFCC"
| 15 || 7 || @ Washington Capitals || 3–1 || 6–9–0
|- align="center" bgcolor="#CCFFCC"
| 16 || 11 || Buffalo Sabres || 7–3 || 7–9–0
|- align="center" bgcolor="white"
| 17 || 13 || @ Buffalo Sabres || 3–3 || 7–9–1
|- align="center" bgcolor="#FFBBBB"
| 18 || 15 || Edmonton Oilers || 5–3 || 7–10–1
|- align="center" bgcolor="#CCFFCC"
| 19 || 18 || Philadelphia Flyers || 5–2 || 8–10–1
|- align="center" bgcolor="#FFBBBB"
| 20 || 21 || @ New York Islanders || 4–3 || 8–11–1
|- align="center" bgcolor="#FFBBBB"
| 21 || 22 || New York Islanders || 7–2 || 8–12–1
|- align="center" bgcolor="white"
| 22 || 25 || Toronto Maple Leafs || 3–3 || 8–12–2
|- align="center" bgcolor="#FFBBBB"
| 23 || 28 || @ Quebec Nordiques || 7–4 || 8–13–2
|- align="center" bgcolor="white"
| 24 || 29 || Quebec Nordiques || 4–4 || 8–13–3
|-

|- align="center" bgcolor="#CCFFCC"
| 25 || 2 || @ Los Angeles Kings || 4–3 || 9–13–3
|- align="center" bgcolor="#CCFFCC"
| 26 || 5 || @ Colorado Rockies || 2–1 || 10–13–3
|- align="center" bgcolor="#FFBBBB"
| 27 || 6 || Hartford Whalers || 5–3 || 10–14–3
|- align="center" bgcolor="#FFBBBB"
| 28 || 9 || Boston Bruins || 4–3 || 10–15–3
|- align="center" bgcolor="#CCFFCC"
| 29 || 12 || @ Philadelphia Flyers || 5–3 || 11–15–3
|- align="center" bgcolor="#CCFFCC"
| 30 || 14 || Pittsburgh Penguins || 5–4 || 12–15–3
|- align="center" bgcolor="#FFBBBB"
| 31 || 16 || Philadelphia Flyers || 7–3 || 12–16–3
|- align="center" bgcolor="white"
| 32 || 19 || @ Pittsburgh Penguins || 3–3 || 12–16–4
|- align="center" bgcolor="#FFBBBB"
| 33 || 20 || Washington Capitals || 3–2 || 12–17–4
|- align="center" bgcolor="#CCFFCC"
| 34 || 23 || Winnipeg Jets || 5–2 || 13–17–4
|- align="center" bgcolor="white"
| 35 || 26 || @ Washington Capitals || 4–4 || 13–17–5
|- align="center" bgcolor="#CCFFCC"
| 36 || 27 || Pittsburgh Penguins || 5–3 || 14–17–5
|- align="center" bgcolor="#CCFFCC"
| 37 || 30 || New York Islanders || 6–4 || 15–17–5
|-

|- align="center" bgcolor="#CCFFCC"
| 38 || 2 || @ Montreal Canadiens || 6–5 || 16–17–5
|- align="center" bgcolor="#FFBBBB"
| 39 || 3 || Washington Capitals || 4–3 || 16–18–5
|- align="center" bgcolor="#CCFFCC"
| 40 || 7 || Vancouver Canucks || 4–1 || 17–18–5
|- align="center" bgcolor="#CCFFCC"
| 41 || 9 || Chicago Black Hawks || 7–5 || 18–18–5
|- align="center" bgcolor="#CCFFCC"
| 42 || 11 || Minnesota North Stars || 5–3 || 19–18–5
|- align="center" bgcolor="#CCFFCC"
| 43 || 13 || @ Minnesota North Stars || 2–0 || 20–18–5
|- align="center" bgcolor="white"
| 44 || 15 || @ Winnipeg Jets || 4–4 || 20–18–6
|- align="center" bgcolor="#FFBBBB"
| 45 || 18 || @ Toronto Maple Leafs || 6–2 || 20–19–6
|- align="center" bgcolor="#CCFFCC"
| 46 || 20 || New York Islanders || 3–2 || 21–19–6
|- align="center" bgcolor="#FFBBBB"
| 47 || 23 || @ New York Islanders || 6–1 || 21–20–6
|- align="center" bgcolor="white"
| 48 || 24 || Washington Capitals || 4–4 || 21–20–7
|- align="center" bgcolor="#CCFFCC"
| 49 || 27 || @ Washington Capitals || 5–4 || 22–20–7
|- align="center" bgcolor="#CCFFCC"
| 50 || 29 || @ Colorado Rockies || 5–2 || 23–20–7
|- align="center" bgcolor="#CCFFCC"
| 51 || 31 || @ Los Angeles Kings || 6–3 || 24–20–7
|-

|- align="center" bgcolor="#CCFFCC"
| 52 || 2 || @ Vancouver Canucks || 4–3 || 25–20–7
|- align="center" bgcolor="white"
| 53 || 4 || @ Calgary Flames || 4–4 || 25–20–8
|- align="center" bgcolor="#FFBBBB"
| 54 || 7 || @ Edmonton Oilers || 8–4 || 25–21–8
|- align="center" bgcolor="white"
| 55 || 10 || @ St. Louis Blues || 3–3 || 25–21–9
|- align="center" bgcolor="#CCFFCC"
| 56 || 13 || @ Hartford Whalers || 3–2 || 26–21–9
|- align="center" bgcolor="#CCFFCC"
| 57 || 14 || Quebec Nordiques || 5–2 || 27–21–9
|- align="center" bgcolor="#CCFFCC"
| 58 || 17 || @ Pittsburgh Penguins || 5–3 || 28–21–9
|- align="center" bgcolor="white"
| 59 || 18 || Colorado Rockies || 4–4 || 28–21–10
|- align="center" bgcolor="#FFBBBB"
| 60 || 21 || Montreal Canadiens || 4–2 || 28–22–10
|- align="center" bgcolor="#CCFFCC"
| 61 || 24 || Chicago Black Hawks || 6–4 || 29–22–10
|- align="center" bgcolor="#CCFFCC"
| 62 || 27 || @ Boston Bruins || 6–4 || 30–22–10
|- align="center" bgcolor="#FFBBBB"
| 63 || 28 || Pittsburgh Penguins || 4–2 || 30–23–10
|-

|- align="center" bgcolor="#CCFFCC"
| 64 || 3 || Calgary Flames || 4–2 || 31–23–10
|- align="center" bgcolor="white"
| 65 || 4 || @ Philadelphia Flyers || 4–4 || 31–23–11
|- align="center" bgcolor="#FFBBBB"
| 66 || 6 || @ New York Islanders || 6–4 || 31–24–11
|- align="center" bgcolor="#CCFFCC"
| 67 || 8 || Detroit Red Wings || 6–3 || 32–24–11
|- align="center" bgcolor="white"
| 68 || 10 || Philadelphia Flyers || 5–5 || 32–24–12
|- align="center" bgcolor="#CCFFCC"
| 69 || 11 || @ Detroit Red Wings || 4–1 || 33–24–12
|- align="center" bgcolor="white"
| 70 || 14 || Washington Capitals || 5–5 || 33–24–13
|- align="center" bgcolor="#CCFFCC"
| 71 || 17 || Philadelphia Flyers || 5–2 || 34–24–13
|- align="center" bgcolor="#CCFFCC"
| 72 || 20 || @ Washington Capitals || 4–3 || 35–24–13
|- align="center" bgcolor="#CCFFCC"
| 73 || 21 || St. Louis Blues || 8–5 || 36–24–13
|- align="center" bgcolor="#CCFFCC"
| 74 || 24 || @ Pittsburgh Penguins || 7–2 || 37–24–13
|- align="center" bgcolor="#CCFFCC"
| 75 || 26 || @ Buffalo Sabres || 8–5 || 38–24–13
|- align="center" bgcolor="#FFBBBB"
| 76 || 28 || @ Philadelphia Flyers || 3–1 || 38–25–13
|- align="center" bgcolor="#FFBBBB"
| 77 || 29 || New York Islanders || 7–3 || 38–26–13
|- align="center" bgcolor="#CCFFCC"
| 78 || 31 || @ Chicago Black Hawks || 4–1 || 39–26–13
|-

|- align="center" bgcolor="#FFBBBB"
| 79 || 2 || Pittsburgh Penguins || 7–5 || 39–27–13
|- align="center" bgcolor="white"
| 80 || 3 || @ Hartford Whalers || 3–3 || 39–27–14
|-

Playoffs

Key:  Win  Loss

Player statistics
Skaters

Goaltenders

†Denotes player spent time with another team before joining Rangers. Stats reflect time with Rangers only.
‡Traded mid-season. Stats reflect time with Rangers only.

Awards and records

Transactions

 September 8, 1981 – Rangers trade Doug Soetaert to the Winnipeg Jets for a 1983 3rd round pick.
 October 2, 1981 – Rangers acquire Mike Rogers from the Hartford Whalers for Chris Kotsopoulos, Doug Sulliman, and Gerry McDonald.
 October 16, 1981 – Rangers acquire Pat Hickey from the Toronto Maple Leafs for a 1982 5th round pick.
 October 30, 1981 – Rangers acquire the rights to Tom Younghans from the Minnesota North Stars for cash.
 December 11, 1981 – Rangers acquire Eddie Mio from the Edmonton Oilers for Lance Nethery.
 December 30, 1981 – Rangers acquire Robbie Ftorek and a 1982 8th round pick from the Quebec Nordiques for Jere Gillis and Dean Talafous.  Talafous, however, did not report to the Nordiques and an arbitrator awarded Pat Hickey to the Nordiques on March 8, 1982.
 February 2, 1982 – Rangers acquire Rob McClanahan from the Hartford Whalers for a 1982 10th round pick.

Draft picks
New York's picks at the 1981 NHL Entry Draft in Montreal, Quebec, Canada at the Montreal Forum.

Farm teams

References

New York Rangers seasons
New York Rangers
New York Rangers
New York Rangers
New York Rangers
1980s in Manhattan
Madison Square Garden